is a Japanese manga artist. She graduated from Saitama Prefectural Dai-Ichi Girls High School. Akaishi then attended Musashino Art University where she graduated with a degree in commercial plastic model design. In 1979, she won first place in the Shogakukan Shinjin Comic Award contest.

Akaishi's debut story, Marshmallow Tea wa Hitori de, appeared in the January 1980 issue of Bessatsu Shōjo Comic. Her story, One More Jump , won the 1994 Shogakukan Manga Award for children's manga. She was one of the judges for the 53rd Shogakukan Manga Awards in 2008.

Works

References

External links
  
  (archive to 2004) English 
 

1959 births
Living people
Japanese writers
People from Saitama (city)
Manga artists from Saitama Prefecture